A lead service line (LSL, also known as lead service pipe, and lead connection pipe) is a pipe made of lead which is used in potable water distribution to connect a water main to a user's premises.

Lead exposure is a public health hazard as it causes developmental effects in fetuses, infants, and young children. It also has other health effects in adults. According to World Health Organization, the presence of lead service lines is the most significant contributor of lead contamination in drinking water in many countries.

The most certain way to eliminate lead exposure in drinking water from the lead service lines is to replace them with pipes made from other materials. However, the replacements are time-consuming and costly. The difficulty is exacerbated in many locations by ownership structure that has a shared responsibility between water utilities and property owners, which requires cooperation between the two entities. Some water utilities employed corrosion control as a short-term solution while working through the long-term replacement projects. A potential issue with corrosion control is a constant monitoring of its effectiveness. There have been widespread lead exposures resulting from failures of corrosion control, such as the Flint water crisis.

Background
Lead had been associated with plumbing since the ancient times. The chemical symbol of lead (Pb) was derived from the Latin word plumbum which means waterworks or plumbing as lead was used to make water pipes. Lead water lines have also been known to be harmful since ancient times, though this is contested by industry trade groups within the United States.

In modern times, lead was still widely used in water distribution systems and plumbing hardware before the early 20th century, including lead pipes, leaded solder and leaded alloys. One part of the systems is the connections between the water mains and the water user locations. A service line is a pipe that makes the connection, which was also made of lead in those days. The first portion of the service line called gooseneck that connects to a valve at the water main requires to be flexible to allow some movements. Lead goosenecks (also called lead service connections or LSCs) were commonly used at the time due to the durability and flexibility. In colder-weather areas, the connection between the water main and the rest of the service line is subjected to expansion and contraction during changing temperatures. When a stiffer service line made of galvanized steel pipe was used, a lead gooseneck was installed to connect to the water main to reduce breakages by such expansion and contraction.

From the mid-1800s to the early-1900s, many communities started to realize health risks of lead and began to phase out some of the lead-containing products. In Australia, the use of lead service lines was restricted in the 1930s, while other countries still continued the practice of using lead service lines decades later. An example is in the United States, where many cities were allowed to use lead service lines up to the 1980s. Not only they were allowed, some parts of the United States required to use lead service lines until 1987. This resulted in as many as 3.3 million lead service lines and 6.4 million lead goosenecks in the country. In England and Wales, there were about 8.9 million homes with lead service lines as of 1997.

In the 2010s, one-third of American communities still had lead service lines, with an estimate to be up to six million. Elimination had been extremely difficult due to the high cost of identifying, locating, removing, and preventing the many potential sources of lead in various water distributions systems in the United States.

Health effects

Lead exposure, even at low levels, can cause neurological effects, especially in young children, young women, and developing fetuses. In fetuses, lead in mother's bones is released along with calcium as part of the fetal bone formation. Lead exposure can also cross placental barrier into a fetus. This could cause premature birth, growth issues, and death of the fetus. In infants, lead exposure from mother can pass through breast feeding. In children, the effects of lead exposure include learning problems, slow growth, and lower IQ. In adults, low level exposure can cause hypertension, cognitive issues, and reproductive harms.

Regulations
World Health Organization (WHO) published the first edition of Guidelines for Drinking-water Quality (GDWQ) in 1984 to replace the 1970 European Standards for Drinking-Water and 1971 International Standards for Drinking-Water. The publication recommended the limits of contaminants in drinking water which set the value for lead to not more than 0.05 mg/L based on an assumption about various sources of lead intake and the provisional tolerable weekly intake of 3 mg of lead per adult that was established by Joint FAO/WHO Expert Committee on Food Additives (JECFA) in 1972. However, no safe levels had been defined. In 1986, JECFA updated the provisional tolerable weekly intake level of lead for infants and children to be based on body weights at 25 micrograms of lead per one kilogram of body weight. JECFA reconfirmed this provisional tolerable value and extended the same value to all age groups in 1993. When WHO published the second edition of GDWQ in 1996, it based the on the new JECFA value with assumptions that 50% of lead exposure were from drinking water and a 5-kg infant consuming 0.75 liters from bottles per day, and infants are in the most sensitive subgroup. Therefore, WHO established the guideline value of lead concentration in drinking water not to exceed 0.01 mg/L.

Argentina
As of early 2020 Argentina sets a standard of 0.05 mg/L based on Resolution no. 523/95-MTSS which is an amendment of law 19587.

Australia
In 2004, Australia lowered lead exposure limit to 0.01 mg/L from 0.05 through the 2004 Australian Drinking Water Guidelines. However, this is a guideline, not a mandatory standard.

European Union
On 3 November 1998, the European Union adopted Directive 98/83/EC to set standards on drinking water. This included a plan to lower the lead contamination in the water distribution systems of member states. The Directive sets the maximum lead concentration in drinking water at 0.025 mg/L by 2003, and 0.01 by 2013.

A study in 1999 gave an estimate of the lead service lines in some European countries. Ireland, United Kingdom, France, Portugal, and Belgium all had higher percentages of lead lines ranging between 15% and 51%. Germany, Spain, Italy, Luxembourg, Netherlands had between 3% and 9%, while Denmark and Greece had less than 1%.

The approaches to reduce lead exposure in water distribution systems to meet that goal have also been different. For example, the United Kingdom took the short- and medium-term strategy of dosing the water with orthophosphate as a corrosion control measure and considered lead service line replacement as the long-term strategy. By 2010 (3 years before the new lower standard), 95% of public water supplies were treated with orthophosphate. The tests had 99.8% compliance of 0.025 mg/L 2003 standard and 99.0% compliance of 0.01 mg/L 2013 standard. However, many other European countries considered the practice of adding orthophosphate to the water supply to be undesirable as it would result in sewage with higher concentrations of nutrient. That could potentially create problems of harmful algal blooms. An example of a country that took another approach was Germany. The southern part of Germany had prohibited lead pipes more than 100 years ago. However, northern Germany continued to use lead pipes until the 1970s. The approach to meet the new standard for Germany was to put a focus on getting rid of lead service lines. Water utilities in northern Germany had already been working on lead service line replacements since the adoption of the Directive, in order to meet the 2003 standard.

Canada
In 1992, the federal government set the guideline to have the Maximum Allowable Concentration (MAC) of lead in drinking water at 0.01 mg/L. On 8 March 2019, Health Canada updated the guideline to lower the MAC of lead to 0.005 mg/L, one of the lowest values in the world. Regulation of these guidelines are performed at the provincial level, and is inconsistent.

On 4 November 2019, Concordia University published a year-long study which found that one-third of water samples from 11 major Canadian cities tested higher for MAC of lead than the national guideline, with the highest levels recorded from samples in Montreal, Prince Rupert, and Regina. It was also found that some municipalities only had estimates on the number of lead service lines still in use, with no exact data available.

United States

As of 2019, federal regulations in the United States specify an "action level" for lead at 0.015 mg/L. A public water system is required to monitor its water supply at customer locations. If more than 10% of tap water samples exceed the lead action level (or the copper action level of 1.3 ppm), the supplier must take additional steps to control corrosion. Other actions may include installation of treatment, checking of source water, removal of lead-containing plumbing, and public education. If corrosion control and monitoring of source water measures fail to keep lead exposure under the action level, water utilities must initiate a lead service line replacement program with at least 7% of total lead service lines identified at the beginning of the program to be replaced annually.

Uruguay
Uruguay set the lead exposure of drinking water to 0.05 mg/L in 2000 through Decree 315/94, 2nd edition. It also banned lead water pipes and fittings in 2004. The country set new standards in 2011 through Decree 375/11 to lowered exposure level to 0.03 mg/L and to achieve 0.01 mg/L level by 2021.

Replacements

Responsibilities
There are two parts in a service line. The first part is the pipe that connects the water main to the curb stop which is a stop valve that is located around the street curb or the property line. That first section is called communication pipe. The second part is the pipe that connects the curb stop to the building inlet or a water meter. This part is called supply pipe. Depending on local water utilities, sometimes the meter is located at the property line instead. When the water meter is located at that alternative position, the pipe section that connects the water main to the water meter is the communication pipe, and the section that connects the water meter to the building isolation valve is the supply pipe. Lead service lines can be in one of these scenarios: the communication pipe section can be made of lead, that is called lead communication pipe; the supply pipe section can be made of lead, that is called lead supply pipe; the entire length can be made out of lead; or only a small section of the communication pipe at the water main is made out of lead (lead gooseneck).

The ownership structure of service lines varies among water utilities. Depending on localities, the entire length of a service line from the water main to the building inlet may be owned by the water utility, or the property owner. There can also be a partial ownership scenario where the water utility and the property owner share ownership of the service line, thus, replacing the entire lead service line requires a cooperation between the two entities. In the shared ownership, the water utility typically owns the communication pipe and the curb stop, and property owner owns the supply pipe. In this scenario, when the water utility owned section of a lead service line is called public lead service line, and the section owned by the property owner is called private lead service line. When only one part of a lead service line (either public or private) is replaced, it is called partial lead service line replacement. When both sides are replaced at the same time, it is called full lead service line replacement.

When there is an involvement with private ownership, it complicates a full lead service line replacement. A major issue is the cost of the replacement. In the United States, a replacement can cost between $3,000 to $5,000 (2018 estimate) for the private side. This can be a major financial burden for homeowners. Even with different incentives for homeowners such as interest-free loans, or using ratepayer money to cover part of the cost, the homeowners are still hesitant. Using the ratepayer money to fund private lead service line replacements in itself is a subject of a debate. People who advocate for it argue that benefits to the public health outweigh a small increase in water rates that impacts everyone. On the other side, there is a concern that the increased rates can cause hardship, and there is a public policy question on using ratepayer money to make private property improvements.

Even in the case that private lead service line replacements that are fully funded at no cost to property owners, some owners still refuse to allow their water utility to work in their property for various reasons, such as fearing of damages done to the property, or not wanting workers to be inside. For example, in Pittsburgh, 10% of property owners refused the no-cost private lead service line replacement. This problem is exacerbated in rental properties where tenants had no authority to accept the offer, and the landlords do not see the value of the investment. For cities with a large amount of renters, it will be difficult to complete a full lead service line replacement program without any forms of mandate through a local ordinance. Alternately, some common law jurisdictions may have enough legal precedent in regard to public nuisance law. The court may allow the municipality to access a private property to address the public health threat without having to obtain a permission from the property owner.

Partial replacements
A partial lead service line replacement involves replacing a service line in only one portion (whether it is the public or private portion) and leave the other portion intact. This practice does not completely remove the lead source from the water distribution. Additionally, studies have found that a partial lead service line replacement can cause short-term elevation of lead concentration due to the disturbances during the replacement. An Advisory Board of the United States Environmental Protection Agency concluded in 2011 that they had enough data to show that such practice could pose a public health risk. An Advisory Committee of the Centers for Disease Control and Prevention agreed with that position. Therefore, a partial lead service line replacement should be avoided. In 2014, the American Water Works Association published a communication guideline with a definition of a partial lead service line replacement to include a repair and a reconnection to a lead service line. It recommended that entire lead service line should be replaced instead of a partial replacement. They also provided a guidance on homeowner notifications before partial replacements and water utilities' commitment to follow-up tests. In 2017, a study of the Canadian House of Commons Standing Committee on Transport, Infrastructure and Communities concurred that partial replacements can aggravate the problem of lead exceedances.

Full replacements
A full lead service line replacement involves replacing the entire service line from the water main to the building inlet. This includes the public and the private portions of the line. In a full lead service line replacement, there should be a coordination with the property owner as it may involve going through obstacles such as trees, driveways, and walls. Sometime, there is a need to break through the customer's basement wall.

Although a full lead service line replacement is a preferred method, it does not come as risk free. There are short-term elevation of lead concentration as well, but it tends to release less lead and to release lead for a shorter period of time. A research has found that even with a full lead service line replacement to completely remove lead source, lead exposure can still exist in the home. In the study it is particularly true when the water source is rich in manganese and iron that has caused the scale build-ups in the interior wall of the home's pipes. The scales can absorb lead from the time before the replacement. When the scales crumble from the pipe walls even after the replacement, they carry lead to customer's tap in particulate form which may continue after the replacement for years. Therefore, an internal plumbing flushing is still required after a full lead service line replacement.

Post replacement flushing procedures
After work done on or near a lead service line, whether it is a partial or full replacement, or other disturbances such as changing of the water meter, the water utility should perform a flushing procedure to take out lead that has been lodged into the building plumbing. Homeowner should not run water through any water filter devices, use hot water or ice makers, or consume tap water until the flushing procedure is completed. For this special flushing procedure, the water utility will perform an initial flush after the work is done. Then the worker will start from the lowest floor to open all cold water taps, showers and bathtub faucets throughout the home. Faucet aerators will be remove during this procedure. At the top floor where the last tap is open, wait for 30 minutes, then start turning off the tap and put back the faucet aerators from the top floor down to the lowest floor.

Replacement progress
Lead exposure in drinking water that is caused by lead service lines can be mitigated in a short term by using corrosion control techniques. However, the only long-term solution is to completely replace them with other materials. Below is a partial list of replacement efforts by water utilities around the world:

Mitigation
While full lead service line replacement is the permanent solution, such undertaking will take years or decades. Water utilities and customers need to use other strategies to mitigate the lead exposure risks in the short term.

Internal corrosion control

Various techniques can be used by water utilities to control internal corrosions, for example, pH level adjustment, adjustment of carbonate and calcium to create calcium carbonate as piping surface coating, and applying a corrosion inhibitor. An example of corrosion inhibitor is using phosphate products such as orthophosphate to form films over pipes. This reduces the chance of leaching of trace metal including lead from the pipe materials into the water. Another example of corrosion inhibitor is to use silicate products. However, the mechanism of film forming and its effectiveness are not well understood.

Flushing
American Water Works Association recommends for a home with lead service line that homeowner should do a morning flush by running the water at the kitchen tap for 3–5 minutes. The amount of required flushing may be longer if the house is far back from the curb which would have a longer lead service line. In order to conserve water, showering and flushing the toilet can also be used. However, those alternative activities will not flush the line at the kitchen where it is the main tap for water consumption. An additional flushing at the kitchen tap for 30–45 seconds is recommended.

Filters
In certain cases when flushing is not practical, such as having a very long lead service line, using filters may be considered. When choosing filters, water consumers should select the products that remove total lead that includes filtering of dissolved lead and lead particles. In United States, it is recommended that the filters are certified according to American National Standard Institute/National Science Foundation Standard 53

Widespread hazards and causes
There were widespread lead contamination in drinking water incidents related to lead service lines. These were caused by many reasons that resulted in elevated levels of lead leaching.

Changing of water source
In 2014, Flint water crisis was caused by switching of water source from Detroit Water and Sewerage Department's treated water to Flint River which would be treated locally in Flint. The treated Flint River water changed the water properties in Flint's distribution system in three areas. First the corrosion inhibitor was not added to the treated water. Secondly, the pH level had been changed over time to lower levels. Thirdly, the chloride level was higher than treated Detroit's water. The combination of these factors contributed to the corrosiveness of the water, causing corrosion to lead and iron pipes. The solution was to switch the water source back to Detroit's water supply and replace 30,000 lead service lines.

Changing of disinfection chemical
In 2000, lead contamination in Washington, D.C. drinking water was caused by changing the disinfection chemical from chlorine to chloramine for water treatment. This was done as a measure to limit disinfection byproducts according to a new regulation of the United States Environmental Protection Agency. The change inadvertently reduced the protective mineral coating properties in the water. That caused the scaling that had been covering the interior surface of lead service lines for decades to be reduced to the point that it allowed lead to leach into the water. The solution was to replace all 23,000 lead service lines. However, 15,000 of those was done as partial replacements which was found to be ineffective.

Changing of corrosion control chemical
In 2014, Pittsburgh water crisis was caused by unauthorized switching of anti-corrosion agent from soda ash to caustic soda. The city had been using soda ash for decades as a corrosion control chemical. Soda ash's alkalinity helps the metals to be less corrosive. It also has another property that leaves a solid residue which encourages mineral buildup as a protective layer within the interior surface of the pipes. Although caustic soda has similar alkalinity, it does not help in buildup creation. After switching the corrosion control chemical, the buildup in the city's distribution system started to disappear causing leaching in the lead service lines. The short-term solution was to use orthophosphate to create coating. The long-term solution was to do full lead service line replacements. The city started the replacements in 2016. By 2019, 4,200 lead service lines had been replaced. On the same year, the city budgeted $49 million to replace another 4,400 public service lines and offer no cost private line replacements at the same time.

Adjustment of pH levels
In 2016, water in Newark, New Jersey started having elevated lead levels. A year earlier, the city tried to adjust the pH levels in order to control carcinogens in the system. The result of higher acidity caused the sodium silicate that was used successfully as corrosion inhibitor for two decades to stop working. It took the city until 2018 to figure out the short-term solution to change to use orthophosphate, but that would take another six months to become effective. Water bottles and water filters were distributed as a stop gap. The long-term solution was for the city to do 18,000 full lead service line replacements. The city took unprecedented steps by borrowing $120 million to shorten the replacement timeframe to 3 years from 10 years, and working with legislators to come up with a law that allows the city to force replace the private portion of the lines free of charge and without any permission from property owners.

Physical disturbances
In Chicago, after Mayor Rahm Emanuel took office in 2011, he initiated a $481 million water conservation initiative that included household water meter replacements. The work was carried in a multi-year project. In 2013, a study by United States Environmental Protection Agency (EPA) concluded that disturbances to lead service lines including street work or water meter installation could cause the leaching of lead to be elevated for months or years. During Mayor Emanuel's administration, the city consistently denied that it had any widespread problems of lead in water, and continued the meter installation. In July 2019, Mayor Lori Lightfoot who took office in the same year announced that the tests had shown elevated levels of lead in more than 1 in 5 metered homes, and she ordered to halt the meter installation program.  The city also faced a lawsuit filed on behalf of the residents to force the city to solve the problem by replacing their lead service lines.

Also with the water related projects, Mayor Emanuel borrowed $412 million from 2011 to 2016 with two-thirds of that money went to replacements of  water mains, but those projects didn't include lead service line replacements. The workers would reconnect lead service lines to the newly installed water mains. In 2016, the city claimed that there was no evidence of risks associated with that method. The claim contradicted the 2013 EPA report and another finding in 2015 by the City of Milwaukee that prompted Milwaukee to stop installing new water mains. In addition to potential issues with reconnecting lead service lines back to water mains, there were also concerns about how the city repaired damages. During the projects, when the city damaged a lead service line, the city workers would cut off the broken part of the lead service line and replace that short section with a copper line. A scientist who tested the water after that repair procedure was done on his home found an extremely high level of lead. However, the city did not perform any tests or notified any homeowners on such repairs as that type of repairs was not considered to be a partial lead service line replacement, therefore, follow-up tests were not required by regulations. An EPA Advisory Board concluded that the procedure could be more dangerous than a partial lead service line replacement. After 87 months of work when the city completed two-thirds of the water main replacement project, the total amount of repairs using that procedure was still not available. There was an incomplete record that only showed a one-month snapshot to indicate that nine such repairs were done during that month.

Unspecified causes
In some cases, high level of lead in drinking water may have not been caused by a specific incident. The cause may or may not be pinpointed to lead service lines.

In 2015, Irish Water sent out a warning that 126 households in Wexford had the level of lead that exceeded the limit. It urged residents to stop using their water for drinking unless a five to ten minute flush had been performed. The company also recommended owners to replace their lead service lines which are responsibility of property owners in Ireland. Starting in 2017, more than 30 areas across Ireland had found to have unsafe level of lead. Irish Water had been replacing lead service lines at their own costs as part of their leakage reduction program.

In 2017 a report from French Agency for Food, Environmental and Occupational Health & Safety (ANSES) indicated that many older properties are at risk of high lead concentration, especially for those properties located in areas with older water distribution systems. The agency urged property owners to take mitigation efforts including replacements of water pipes.

See also
 Lead poisoning
 Plumbosolvency
 Water distribution system

References

Plumbing
Water supply infrastructure
Lead poisoning